Robert "Bob" G. Rosehart (born 1943) is a Canadian chemical engineer and university executive.

Born in Owen Sound, Ontario, he received a B.A.Sc. degree in 1966, a M.A.Sc. in 1968, and a Ph.D. in 1976 from the University of Waterloo.

In 1987, he became the President of Lakehead University and in 1999 he became President of Wilfrid Laurier University. Rosehart served as interim principal of Renison University College from 2008-2009 and was later made an Honorary Senior Fellow of the college in 2012.

Rosehart ran in the 2011 federal election for the Liberal Party of Canada in the riding of Kitchener-Conestoga, and lost to incumbent Harold Albrecht.

Electoral Record

See also
 List of University of Waterloo people

References

 

1943 births
Living people
Canadian university and college chief executives
People from Owen Sound
University of Waterloo alumni
Canadian chemical engineers